is a children's magazine published by the "Family Light Association" (家の光協会 Ie no Hikari Kyōkai) in Japan. The magazine was formerly published under the title Children's Light (こどもの光 Kodomo no Hikari).

History and profile
The magazine was started under the name Kodomo no Hikari in 1964. The publication is funded by the Central Union of Agricultural Cooperatives. It is published on a monthly basis.

In August 1993 the title of the magazine was changed into its current name, Chagurin. The goal of the magazine is to educate the next generation of Japan Agricultural Cooperative (or "JA") members. The magazine is difficult to find in the average bookstore in Japan, but it can be purchased at any local JA office. Clear submission guidelines for the children of the magazine's readers are available at any local JA office as well. The contents of Chagurin are intended to be similar to the educational magazines published by Shogakukan up through the 1960s, and has received a recommendation from the National PTA of Japan.

Like other magazines aimed at children, it includes a variety of manga. However, the manga found in Chagurin tends to be fairly mainstream, non-controversial, and is not generally collected in tankōbon format (Doraemon and Kiteretsu Daihyakka being exceptions).

Notes

External links
Chagurin Official Site
Ie no Hikari Association

1964 establishments in Japan
Agricultural magazines
Children's magazines published in Japan
Education magazines
Magazines established in 1964
Magazines published in Tokyo
Manga magazines published in Japan

Monthly manga magazines published in Japan